Events in the year 1945 in the British Mandate of Palestine.

Incumbents
 High Commissioner – John Vereker, 6th Viscount Gort until 5 November; Sir Alan Cunningham
 Emirate of Transjordan – Abdullah I bin al-Hussein
 Prime Minister of Transjordan – Samir al-Rifai until 19 May; Ibrahim Hashem

Events

 11 July – The founding of the kibbutz Hukok.
 15 July – Jewish Holocaust survivors of the Buchenwald Nazi concentration camp arrive at Haifa port and are arrested by the British.
 31 August – U.S. President Harry Truman issues a statement requesting the British government to admit 100,000 Jewish refugees in Europe into Palestine.
 27 September – The Defence Emergency Regulations are enacted by the Mandatory authorities.
 2 November – Arabs demonstrate against the British.
 5 November – Sir Alan Cunningham assumes office as the High Commissioner of Palestine.

Unknown dates
 The founding of the kibbutz Gal'ed.

Notable births
 17 January – Asher Grunis, Israeli jurist, former President of the Supreme Court of Israel
 30 January – Yoram Lass, Israeli politician and physician, professor of medicine at Tel Aviv University
 9 February – Haim Be'er, Israeli novelist
 20 February – Amram Mitzna, Israeli politician and former general, acting Mayor of Yeruham, former Mayor of Haifa
 23 February – Yossi Ben Hanan, Israeli general
 1 March – Tom Segev, Israeli historian
 1 March – Ehud Yaari, Israeli journalist
 8 March – Atar Arad, Israeli-American musician
 8 March – David Ascalon, Israeli sculptor and stained glass artist
 15 March – Danny Yatom, Israeli politician and Mossad head
 22 March – Hillel Weiss, Israeli literature professor
 28 March – Ruth Gavison, Israeli jurist
 29 March – Yehuda Barkan, Israeli actor, producer, director and screenwriter (died 2020)
 2 April – Moshe Peled, Israeli politician
 9 April – Adam Baruch, Israeli journalist, writer and art critic (died 2008)
 10 April – Mordechai Mishani, Israeli politician (died 2013)
 19 April – Eliezer Mizrahi, Israeli painter
 21 April – Nadav Levitan, Israeli film director and screenwriter (died 2010)
 26 April – Avishai Henik, Israeli neurocognitive psychologist
 14 May – Yochanan Vollach, Israeli footballer
 28 May – Anat Maor, Israeli politician
 30 May – Makram Khoury, Arab-Israeli actor, first Arab to win the Israel Prize
 1 June – Menachem Froman, Israeli rabbi and political activist (died 2013)
 5 June –  Nechama Rivlin, First Lady of Israel (died 2019)
 19 June – Leah Tsemel, Israeli lawyer
 27 June – Ami Ayalon, Israeli politician and a former member of the Knesset for the Labor Party
 3 July – Saharon Shelah, Israeli mathematician
 5 July – Yosef Shapira, Israeli judge, current State Comptroller of Israel
 25 July - Rachel Shapira, Israeli songwriter and poet
 18 August – Yair Shamir, Israeli politician, businessman, and Air Force officer
 30 August – Daniella Weiss, Israeli settlement movement activist
 31 August – Itzhak Perlman, Israeli-American violinist and conductor
 29 September – Yair Garbuz, Israeli artist
 30 September – Ehud Olmert, 12th Prime Minister of Israel
 10 October – Miriam Adelson, Israeli-American philanthropist
 14 October – Muki Betser, Israeli special forces officer, founder of the Shaldag Unit
 9 November – Zevulun Orlev, Israeli politician
 23 November – Assi Dayan, Israeli film director, actor, screenwriter and producer (died 2014)
 27 November – Akiva Eldar, Israeli journalist
 1 December – Rami Bar-Niv, Israeli pianist, composer, and author
 22 December – Amiram Goldblum, Israeli chemist and political activist
 31 December – Tuvia Tzafir, Israeli actor and comedian
 Full date unknown
Giora Romm, Israeli Air Force officer, director of the Civil Aviation Authority of Israel
Adina Bar-Shalom, Israeli educator, columnist, and social activist. 
Yosef Amit, Israeli military intelligence officer who was convicted of spying for the United States
Erela Golan, Israeli politician
Amir Nachumi, Israeli Air Force general and ace
Eli Alon, Israeli anesthesiologist
Nitza Metzger-Szmuk, Israeli archaeologist
Mahmoud al-Zahar, Palestinian militant, co-founder of Hamas

Notable deaths

 22 January – Else Lasker-Schüler (born 1869), German-born Palestinian Jewish poet
 11 June – Eliyahu Golomb (born 1893), Russian (Belarus)-born leader of the Jewish defense effort in Mandate Palestine and chief architect of the Haganah
 20 July – Yohanan Levi (born 1901), German-born Palestinian Jewish Hebrew linguist and historian, specialising in the Second Temple period
 11 November – Yehoshua Hankin (born 1864), Russian (Ukraine)-born Zionist activist who was responsible for most of the major land purchases of the World Zionist Organization in Ottoman Palestine

References 

 
Palestine
Years in Mandatory Palestine
Mandatory Palestine in World War II